Albertet is the Occitan diminutive of Albert (given name). It is commonly associated with two troubadours:

Albertet Cailla
Albertet de Sestaro (an unqualified "Albertet" usually means this troubadour)

See also
Albert
Alberte

Masculine given names
French masculine given names